Maccabeus or Machabeus may refer to:
 Maccabeus (worm), a sole genus of Seticoronarian priapulid worm
 Judas Maccabeus, a Kohen (Jewish priest) who led a revolt against the Seleucid Empire
 Gilla Mo Chaidbeo, Irish abbot (d. 1174), also known as Maccabeus or Machabeus
 Rudolf, Count of Montescaglioso, also known as Maccabeus

See also
 Maccabees (disambiguation)
 Maccabi (disambiguation)
 Maccabiah (disambiguation)